Praise and worship  may refer to:

 Christian worship
 Contemporary worship
 Contemporary worship music
 Jewish prayer
 Salah, Islamic prayer
 Praise & Worship, a 2006 album by Commissioned

See also
 Praise (disambiguation)
 Worship (disambiguation)